Chowdavaram may refer to:

Chowdavaram, Guntur, a suburb of Guntur city, Andhra Pradesh, India
Chowdavaram OW, a village in Vemsoor mandal, Khammam district, Telangana, India
Chodavaram, Visakhapatnam district, a village in Visakhapatnam district, Andhra Pradesh, India
Chodavaram, Nagayalanka mandal, a village in Nagayalanka mandal, Krishna district, Andhra Pradesh, India
Chodavaram, Penamaluru mandal, a village in Penamaluru mandal, Krishna district, Andhra Pradesh, India
Chodavaram, East Godavari district, a village in East Godavari district, Andhra Pradesh, India
Chodavaram, Prakasam district, a village in Prakasam district, Andhra Pradesh, India